The APA Distinguished Scientific Award for the Applications of Psychology is an award of the American Psychological Association

Recipients 
Source: APA

20th Century 
 1973 Conrad L. Kraft
 1974 Gerald S. Lesser, Edward L. Palmer
 1975 Nathan H. Azrin
 1976 Fred S. Keller
 1977 Starke R. Hathaway
 1978 Alphonse Chapanis
 1979 Joseph Wolpe
 1980 Edwin A. Fleishman
 1981 Anne Anastasi
 1982 Robert M. Gagné
 1983 Donald E. Super
 1984 Gerald R. Patterson
 1985 John Money
 1986 Martin T. Orne
 1987 Robert Glaser
 1988 Leonard Berkowitz
 1989 Aaron T. Beck
 1990 Wallace E. Lambert
 1991 Joseph V. Brady
 1992 Charles R. Schuster
 1993 Herschel W. Leibowitz
 1994 John E. Hunter, Frank L. Schmidt
 1995 Ann L. Brown
 1996 Ward Edwards
 1997 Harold Stevenson
 1998/1999 Loren J. Chapman, Jean P. Chapman
 2000 David H. Barlow

21st Century 
 2001 David T. Lykken
 2002 Robert Rosenthal
 2003 Stephen J. Ceci, Elizabeth F. Loftus
 2004 Edward Taub
 2005 Karen A. Matthews
 2006 John P. Campbell
 2007 Karl G. Jöreskog, Peter M. Bentler
 2008 John L. Holland
 2009 Nancy E. Adler
 2010 David M. Clark
 2011 Alan E. Kazdin
 2012 Kelly D. Brownell
 2013 J. Richard Hackman
 2014 G. Terence Wilson
 2015 Michael E. Lamb
 2016 James W. Pennebaker
 2017 Jacquelynne S. Eccles
 2018 Kenneth A. Dodge
 2019 James S. Jackson
 2020 Steven D. Hollon
 2021 James H. Sidanius
 2022 Christopher G. Fairburn

See also

 List of psychology awards

References 

American Psychological Association
American psychology awards